William of Conches (c. 1090/1091 – c. 1155/1170s) was a French scholastic philosopher who sought to expand the bounds of Christian humanism by studying secular works of the classics and fostering empirical science. He was a prominent member of the School of Chartres. John of Salisbury, a bishop of Chartres and former student of William's, refers to William as the most talented grammarian after Bernard of Chartres.

Life

He was born in Conches, Normandy. His teaching activity extended from c. 1120 to 1154, and about the year 1145 he became the tutor of Henry Plantagenet. It is possible, but uncertain, that he was teaching at Chartres before that. Warned by a friend of the danger implied in his Platonic realism as he applied it to theology, he took up the study of Islamic philosophy and physical science. When and where he died is a matter of uncertainty.

William devoted much attention to cosmology and psychology. Having been a student of Bernard of Chartres, he shows the characteristic Humanism, tendency towards Platonism, and taste for natural science which distinguish the "Chartrains". He is one of the first of the medieval Christian philosophers to take advantage of Islamic physical and physiological lore, to which he had access in the translations by Constantine the African.

William of St. Thierry, who had encouraged Bernard of Clairvaux to prosecute Abelard, in another letter to Bernard attacked William's De philosophia mundi for having a modalist view of the Holy Trinity. William in consequence revised some controversial parts in the Dragmaticon.

Works
There is a good deal of discussion regarding the authorship of the works ascribed to William. It seems probable, however, that he wrote the encyclopedic De philosophia mundi (or Philosophia) and the related dialogue Dragmaticon, as well as glosses on Plato's Timaeus, on Boethius's Consolation of Philosophy, on Priscian's Institutiones grammaticae, and on Macrobius's Commentary on the Dream of Scipio. He was probably also the author of a lost treatise Magna de naturis philosophia. A work on ethics, the Moralium dogma philosophorum, was attributed to him in the 1920s, but his authorship is now rejected by most scholars.

De philosophia mundi

The De philosophia mundi is divided into four books, covering physics, astronomy, geography, meteorology and medicine.

William explains the world as composed of elements (elementa), which he defines as "the simplest and minimum part[s] of any body—simple in quality, minimum in quantity". He identifies the elements with the traditional four elements (fire, air, water, earth) but (following Constantine the African) not as they are perceived, since as such they are neither simple in quality nor minimum in quantity: earth, for example, contains something hot, something cold, something dry and something wet at the same time. Pure elements are not to be perceived, says William, but to be grasped by reason, through an abstract division of the sensible bodies. Each of these pure elements has two of the four basic qualities: earth is cold and dry, water is cold and humid, air is hot and humid and fire is hot and dry. The perceivable elements, called elementata, are made of pure elements: the sensible earth especially of pure earth, the sensible water especially of pure water, and so on.

The discussion of meteorology includes a description of air becoming less dense and colder as the altitude increases, and William attempts to explain the circulation of the air in connection with the circulation of the oceans. The discussion of medicine deals chiefly with procreation and childbirth. This work influenced Jean de Meung, the author of the second part of the Roman de la Rose.

Editions and translations
De philosophia mundi is edited under the name of Bede in Patrologia Latina, vol. 90, and under the name of Honorius Augustodunensis in vol. 172.
 Gregor Maurach, ed., Philosophia Mundi; Wilhelm von Conches: Ausgabe des 1. Buchs von Wilhelm von Conches Philosophia. Pretoria: University of South Africa, 1974.
 Marco Albertazzi, ed., Philosophia. Lavis: La Finestra, 2010. 
 Édouard Jeauneau, ed., Glosae super Platonem. Paris: Vrin, 1965. 
 Édouard Jeauneau, ed., Glosae super Platonem, Corpus Christianorum Continuatio Mediaevalis 203. Turnhout: Brepols, 2006 (new revised edition)
 Lodi Nauta, ed., Guillelmi de Conchis Glosae super Boetium, Corpus Christianorum Continuatio Mediaevalis 158. Turnhout: Brepols, 1999.  (hardback);  (paperback)
 Bradford Wilson, ed. Glosae in Iuvenalem Paris: Vrin, 1980. 
 Helen Rodnite Lemay, ed., Glosae super Macrobium (State University of New York at Stony Brook, forthcoming)
 Irene Caiazzo, ed., Glosae super Priscianum (CNRS, Paris, forthcoming)
 Italo Ronca, ed., Guillelmi de Conchis Dragmaticon, Corpus Christianorum Continuatio Mediaevalis 152. Turnhout: Brepols, 1997.  (hardback);  (paperback)
 William of Conches, A Dialogue on Natural Philosophy (Dragmaticon Philosophiae), translation with an introduction by Italo Ronca and Matthew Curr, Notre Dame, Ind.: University of Notre Dame Press, 1997

See also
Renaissance of the 12th century

Notes

Further reading
Peter Ellard, The Sacred Cosmos: Theological, Philosophical, and Scientific Conversations in the Twelfth Century School of Chartres, University of Scranton Press, 2007

External links
Etexts of De philosophia mundi and Moralium dogma philosophorum at The Latin Library
Facsimile of ljs384, a late-12th-century manuscript of De philosophia mundi

Scholastic philosophers
1150s deaths
12th-century French writers
12th-century French philosophers
Year of birth uncertain
Year of death unknown
1090s births
French male writers
Christian humanists
12th-century astronomers
Medieval French astronomers
12th-century Latin writers
Commentators on Plato